Thomas Dyer Seeley is the Horace White Professor in Biology in the Department of Neurobiology and Behavior at Cornell University. He is the author of several books on honeybee behavior, including Honeybee Democracy (2010) and The Wisdom of the Hive (1995)  He was the recipient of the Humboldt Prize in Biology in 2001. He primarily studies swarm intelligence by investigating how bees collectively make decisions.

Background
Seeley was born on June 17, 1952.  He grew up in Ellis Hollow, and  went to elementary, middle and high schools in Ithaca, NY. As a high school student he held summer jobs with Royse P. Murphy, a plant geneticist at Cornell University, and Roger Morse, at the Dyce
Laboratory for Honey Bee Studies at Cornell.  Seeley married Robin Hadlock  and the couple had two children.

Education
Seeley enrolled at Dartmouth College in 1970, intending to follow the premedical curriculum, but changed his focus after reading E. O. Wilson’s book The Insect Societies.  Seeley received his A.B. (summa cum laude) in Chemistry from Dartmouth College in 1974 and, four years later, his Ph.D. in Biology from Harvard University. His Ph.D. advisors were Bert Hölldobler and E. O. Wilson.

Appointments
Seeley held the following academic appointments:

Honors and awards
In 1966 Seeley was an Eagle Scout.  In 1974 he received the Hartshorne Chemistry Medal from Dartmouth College.  Four years later he was elected a Junior Fellow at Harvard’s Society of Fellows and in 1983 he was awarded the Morse Prize Fellowship from Yale University.  For a year from 1992, he was a Guggenheim Fellow and then the next year got a Fellowship from Berlin’s Institute for Advanced Study.  In 1994 he received the Hambleton Award from the Eastern Apicultural Society.

In 1998 he received the Gold Medal for the Best Science Book, (The Wisdom of the Hive). Seeley received the Alexander von Humboldt’s Senior Scientist Prize in 2001 and was elected a Fellow of the American Academy of Arts and Sciences that same year.  In 2008 he was an elected fellow for the Animal Behavior Society and in 2013 he gave the keynote address at the 33rd International Apimondia Congress in Kyiv. In 2017 he was awarded fellowship to American Association for the Advancement of Science.

A species of bee, Neocorynurella seeleyi, was named after him in 1997. Seeley was awarded the Golden Goose Award in 2016 for his work on The Honeybee Algorithm.

In 2019 he became a member of the German Academy of Sciences Leopoldina.

Publications
Seeley has authored 5 books, at least 1 newspaper article, and over 175 scholarly publications.

Books 
 Honeybee Ecology:  A Study of Adaptation in Social Life, published by Princeton University Press
 The Wisdom of the Hive:  The Social Physiology of Honeybee Colonies
 Honeybee Democracy, published by the Princeton University Press.
 Following the Wild Bees: The Craft and Science of Beehunting
The Lives of Bees: The Untold Story of the Honey Bee in the Wild

References

1952 births
Living people
American beekeepers
Harvard University alumni
Dartmouth College alumni
Cornell University faculty
Fellows of the American Academy of Arts and Sciences
Members of the German Academy of Sciences Leopoldina